The women's 400 metres hurdles event at the 2004 World Junior Championships in Athletics was held in Grosseto, Italy, at Stadio Olimpico Carlo Zecchini on 14 and 15 July.

Medalists

Results

Final
15 July

Heats
14 July

Heat 1

Heat 2

Heat 3

Participation
According to an unofficial count, 22 athletes from 18 countries participated in the event.

References

400 metres hurdles
400 metres hurdles at the World Athletics U20 Championships